Gonzaga — de Pai pra Filho is a 2012 Brazilian drama film directed by Breno Silveira, written by Patricia Andrade, and starring Chambinho do Acordeon and Júlio Andrade. Inspired by the life of musicians Luiz Gonzaga and Gonzaguinha, father and son respectively, the feature was released in Brazil on October 26, 2012, and was broadcast by Rede Globo in a microseries format between January 17 and 20, 2013, in 4 chapters.

Cast
Chambinho do Acordeon as Luiz Gonzaga
Land Vieira as Luiz Gonzaga (young)
Adelio Lima as Luiz Gonzaga (old)
Júlio Andrade as Gonzaguinha
Giancarlo Di Tommaso as Gonzaguinha (young)
Nanda Costa as Odaleia
 Magdale Alves as Helena
Roberta Gualda as Helena (young)
 Anna Aguiar as Nazinha Deolindo
Cecília Dassi  as Nazinha Deolindo (young)
Domingos Montagner as Coronel Raimundo Deolindo
Sílvia Buarque as Dina Pinheiro
Luciano Quirino as Xavier Pinheiro
Claudio Jaborandy as Januário Gonzaga
Cyria Coentro as Santana Gonzaga
Zezé Motta as Priscila
Olívia Araújo as Priscila (young)
 João Miguel as Miguelzinho
Lulu Santos as Salário Mínimo
Armando Bógus as Coronel Silveira
Xandó Graça as Sargento Loyola
Thalma de Freitas as Dancing singer

References

2012 biographical drama films
Brazilian biographical drama films
Biographical films about musicians
2010s Portuguese-language films